Audrey Elizabeth O'Brien  was the 12th, and first female, Clerk of the House of Commons of Canada.  She was appointed in 2005. The Clerk of the House is a Governor-in-Council nomination and is the chief executive of the administration of the House of Commons. In December 2015, she was appointed as a Member of the Order of Canada for her contributions in the administration of the House of Commons.

References

External links 
 Biography from the Parliament of Canada Web Site

Clerks of the House of Commons (Canada)
Living people
Members of the Order of Canada
Sergeants-at-Arms of the Canadian House of Commons
Year of birth missing (living people)